The political history of Europe during the 2010s covers political events which took place on the continent between 2010 and 2019.

History by country

Albania 
The 2011 Albanian opposition demonstrations were a series of anti-government protests in cities around Albania following 18 months of political conflict over alleged electoral fraud by the opposition. Demonstartions were called for by parliamentary opposition parties, which include the Socialist Party and the Unity for Human Rights Party. The public outcry resulted in the resignation of the deputy prime minister. On 21 January, a protest in Tirana led to the killings of three demonstrators by the Republican Guard during a rally in front of Prime Minister Sali Berisha office, while fourth person died several days later.

Parliamentary elections were held in Albania on 23 June 2013. The result was a victory for the Alliance for a European Albania led by the Socialist Party and its leader, Edi Rama. Incumbent Prime Minister Sali Berisha of the Democratic Party-led Alliance for Employment, Prosperity and Integration conceded defeat on 26 June, widely viewed as a sign of growing democratic maturity in Albania.

The 2017 Albanian opposition protests were a series of anti-government protests, largely in Tirana, which centered around government corruption, the illicit drug situation in Albania, fear of electoral fraud in the parliamentary elections, and alleged manipulation of the voting process by the Socialist government. They were followed by the 2019 protests calling for the cancellation of the 2019 Albanian local elections, fresh elections, resignation of prime minister Edi Rama and his entire cabinet and the installation of a new technocrat government.

Austria 
In the 2013 legislative election the Social Democratic Party of Austria and the Austrian People's Party lost 5 seats and 4 seats, respectively, but with a total of 99 seats they remained in majority. On 14 October 2013 the two parties began government formation talks with each other, which resulted in the grand coalition of the Second Faymann government that was appointed by President of Austria Heinz Fischer. On 17 May 2016, it was succeeded by the Kern government, following Faymann's resignation amidst the 2016 presidential election.

The First Kurz government was formed after the 2017 legislative election. Sebastian Kurz, chairman of the centre-right Austrian People's Party, known by its initials in German as ÖVP, reached an agreement on a coalition with the far-right Freedom Party of Austria (FPÖ), setting the stage for Kurz to become chancellor of Austria—the youngest head of government in Europe—for the first time.

The Ibiza affair was a political scandal in Austria involving Heinz-Christian Strache, the former vice chancellor of Austria and leader of the Freedom Party (FPÖ), and Johann Gudenus, a deputy leader of the Freedom Party. The scandal caused the collapse of the Austrian governing coalition on 18 May 2019 and the announcement of an early election.

Belarus 
The 2010 Belarusian protests were mass protest actions in Belarus against the results of the 2010 Belarusian presidential election, which took place on December 19, 2010 and were brutally dispersed. Between 10,000 and 60,000 people took part in the protest on October Square and Independence Square in Minsk. These were followed by the 2011 Belarusian protests. The 2017 Belarusian protests also followed later.

Belgium 
Following the Belgian general election held on 13 June 2010, a process of cabinet formation started in Belgium. The election produced a very fragmented political landscape, with 11 parties elected to the Chamber of Representatives, none of which won more than 20% of the seats.  The Flemish-Nationalist New Flemish Alliance (N-VA), the largest party in Flanders and the country as a whole, controlled 27 of 150 seats in the lower chamber.  The Francophone Socialist Party (PS), the largest in Wallonia, controlled 26 seats.  Cabinet negotiations continued for a long time. On 1 June 2011, Belgium matched the record for time taken to form a new democratic government after an election, at 353 days, held until then by Cambodia in 2003–2004.

On 11 October 2011, the final agreement for institutional reform was presented to the media. A government coalition was named on 5 December 2011 and sworn in after a total of 541 days of negotiations and formation on 6 December 2011, and 589 days without an elected government with Elio Di Rupo named Prime Minister of the Di Rupo I Government. It was the first time that the Belgian prime minister had been openly gay, as Di Rupo became the world's first male openly gay head of government (and second of any gender, after Iceland's Jóhanna Sigurðardóttir). Elio Di Rupo also became the first native French-speaking prime minister since 1979 and the first prime minister from Wallonia since 1974 and first socialist prime minister since 1974.

The Michel I Government was the Federal Government of Belgium formed following the 2014 Belgian government formation and sworn in on 11 October 2014. The administration was a centre-right coalition of the New Flemish Alliance (N-VA), the Christian Democratic and Flemish (CD&V), the Open Flemish Liberals and Democrats (Open Vld) and the Reformist Movement (MR). The prime minister was Charles Michel. The government had an agenda of socio-economic reforms, especially through austerity measures, with its priorities being improving Belgium's economic competitiveness and reducing unemployment. It fell in December 2018 over the Global Compact for Migration. It was followed by the Michel II Government as a centre minority coalition cabinet of Christian Democratic and Flemish (CD&V), the Open Flemish Liberals and Democrats (Open Vld) and the Reformist Movement (MR). On 26 October 2019, it was announced that Sophie Wilmès would take over the role of Prime Minister from Michel on 1 November 2019, and form a new government as the first ever female Prime Minister of Belgium.

Bosnia and Herzegovina 
Following the general election on 3 October 2010, a process of formation of Bosnia and Herzegovina's Council of Ministers had begun. The resulting election produced a fragmented political landscape without a coalition of a parliamentary majority more than a year after the election. The centre-left Social Democratic Party, the largest party in the Federation of Bosnia and Herzegovina, and the Bosnian Serb autonomist Alliance of Independent Social Democrats, the largest party in Republika Srpska, each had 8 MPs of the total 42 MPs of the House of Representatives (28 from the Federation and 14 from Republika Srpska). Similarly, a crisis of government was also present at the local levels, as well as the Federal entity. In late 2011, the Council of Ministers (i.e. the national government) had been solved, however the country remained in a situation of perpetual political crisis, especially the Federation of Bosnia and Herzegovina. After months of dysfunction and arguments about legality, the entity's short-lived Federal Government had collapsed in February 2013.

The 2014 unrest in Bosnia and Herzegovina was a series of demonstrations and riots that began in the northern town of Tuzla on 4 February 2014 but quickly spread to multiple cities in Bosnia and Herzegovina, including Sarajevo, Zenica, Mostar, Jajce, and Brčko, among others, for social reasons and with the aim of overthrowing the government. The riots were the most violent scenes the country had seen since the end of the Bosnian War in 1995. The rioting largely took place in the entity of Federation of Bosnia and Herzegovina, and the same level of unrest or activism did not occur in Republika Srpska.

Bulgaria 
Following the 2013 Bulgarian protests against the Borisov cabinet of Prime Minister Boyko Borisov over government austerity measures encouraged by the European Union and the International Monetary Fund during the recession and high utility bills, the Borisov government resigned and brought forward the Bulgarian parliamentary election, 2013, which saw a very low voter turnout. Though Borisov's party Citizens for European Development of Bulgaria (GERB) won a plurality with 97 deputies in the National Assembly, it could not form a government and gave up its mandate. The Bulgarian Socialist Party (BSP) led the government under technocratic Prime Minister Plamen Oresharski. The left-wing government of Plamen Oresharski was approved by the 120 members of the BSP and the Movement for Rights and Freedoms. Outside support to the Oresharski Government was also given by nationalist party Ataka, dubbed by some sources as the "hidden coalition partner", or Siderov's "golden finger", and regarded as a key instrument for allowing the Parliament to proceed with its functions, until June 2014.

Croatia 
Croatia finished accession (membership) negotiations on 30 June 2011 and signed the Treaty of Accession on 9 December 2011, setting it on course to become the bloc's 28th member state. A referendum on the EU accession of the Republic of Croatia was held on 22 January 2012. The EU accession referendum passed with 66.27% votes cast in support, 33.13% against the proposed joining of the EU and 0.60% invalid or blank votes; it also passed in all Croatian counties. The ratification process was concluded on 21 June 2013, and entry into force and accession of Croatia to the EU took place on 1 July 2013.

France 
François Hollande was elected to the presidency on 6 May 2012 during the second round with 51.6% of the vote, defeating incumbent Nicolas Sarkozy. During his tenure, Hollande legalised same-sex marriage by passing Bill no. 344, reformed labour laws and credit training programmes, withdrew combat troops present in the Afghanistan military intervention and concluded an EU directive on the protection of animals in laboratory research through a Franco-German contract. Hollande led the country through the January and November 2015 Paris attacks, as well as the 2016 Nice truck attack.

The 2017 French presidential election caused a radical shift in French politics, as the prevailing parties of The Republicans and Socialists failed to make it to the second round of voting, with far-right Marine Le Pen and political newcomer Emmanuel Macron instead facing each other. Macron ended up winning both the presidency, as well as a legislative majority with his newfound party La République En Marche! At the age of 39, Macron became the youngest president in French history. In 2018–19, his leadership was challenged by the populist Yellow vests movement, which also rejected traditional parties.

Hungary 
The Őszöd speech which was followed by mass protests led Fidesz to winning a supermajority in the 2010 election. In 2011, the new Hungarian constitution was adopted in the parliament and in 2012 it became effective, although it was subject to controversies due to its consolidation of power to Fidesz. The party's majority of seats remained after the 2014 election, and following the escalation of the migrant crisis, Fidesz began using right-wing populist and anti-immigrant rhetoric.

Because of Orbán's curtailing of press freedom, erosion of judicial independence and undermining of multiparty democracy, many political scientists and watchdogs consider Hungary to have experienced democratic backsliding during Orbán's tenure. Orbán's attacks on the European Union while accepting its money and funneling it to his allies and family have also led to characterizations of his government as a kleptocracy. Orbán defends his policies as "illiberal democracy."

Italy 
The 2013 Italian general election led to a major change in the country's political landscape, as the traditional center-right and center-left parties were challenged by the new Five Star Movement, a populist party led by comedian Beppe Grillo. None of the three main alliances – the centre-right led by Silvio Berlusconi, the centre-left led by Pier Luigi Bersani and the Five Star Movement  – won an outright majority in Parliament. After a failed attempt to form a government by Bersani, then-secretary of the Democratic Party (PD), and Giorgio Napolitano's re-election as President, Enrico Letta, Bersani's deputy, received the task of forming a grand coalition government. The Letta Cabinet consisted of the PD, Berlusconi's The People of Freedom (PdL), Civic Choice (SC), the Union of the Centre (UdC) and others.

Following the election of Matteo Renzi as Secretary of the PD in December 2013, there were persistent tensions culminating in Letta's resignation as Prime Minister in February 2014. Subsequently, Renzi formed a government based on the same coalition (including the NCD), but in a new fashion. The new Prime Minister had a strong mandate from his party and was reinforced by the PD's strong showing in the 2014 European Parliament election and the election of Sergio Mattarella, a fellow Democrat, as President in 2015. While in power, Renzi implemented several reforms, including a new electoral law (which would later be declared partially unconstitutional by the Constitutional Court), a relaxation of labour and employment laws (known as Jobs Act) with the intention of boosting economic growth, a thorough reform of the public administration, the simplification of the civil trial, the recognition of same-sex unions (not marriages) and the abolition of several minor taxes. As a result of the Libyan civil war, a major problem faced by Renzi was the high level of illegal immigration to Italy. During his tenure, there was an increase in the number of immigrants rescued at sea being brought to southern Italian ports, prompting criticism from the M5S, FI and Northern League (LN), and causing a loss of popularity for Renzi.

In the 2018 Italian general election, no political group or party won an outright majority, resulting in a hung parliament. In the election, the right-wing alliance, in which Matteo Salvini's League (LN) emerged as the main political force, won a plurality of seats in the Chamber of Deputies and in the Senate, while the anti-establishment Five Star Movement (M5S) led by Luigi Di Maio became the party with the largest number of votes.  The centre-left coalition, led by Matteo Renzi, came third. As a result, protracted negotiations were required before a new government could be formed. On 31 May 2018, following 88 days of negotiations and several impasses, law professor Giuseppe Conte was appointed as the prime minister with support from the League and the Five Star Movement, even though not having run for the Italian Parliament. Matteo Salvini of the League and Luigi Di Maio of the Five Star Movement were also appointed as vice premiers, thus forming the 66th Italian government since World War II. The formation of a new government avoided the possibility of immediate new elections. The coalition government was formed between the Lega Nord and Five Star Movement, becoming the first fully populist government in Western Europe.

During the 2019 Italian government crisis, Deputy Prime Minister Salvini announced a motion of no confidence against Conte, after growing tensions within the majority. Salvini's move came right after a vote in the Senate regarding the progress of the Turin–Lyon high-speed railway, in which the Lega voted against an attempt of the M5S to block the construction works. Many political analysts believe the no confidence motion was an attempt to force early elections to improve Lega's standing in Parliament, ensuring Salvini could become the next Prime Minister. On 20 August, following the parliamentary debate in which Conte harshly accused Salvini of being a political opportunist who "had triggered the political crisis only to serve his personal interest", the Prime Minister resigned his post to President Sergio Mattarella. This provoked the resignation of Prime Minister Giuseppe Conte, and resulted in the formation of a new cabinet led by Conte himself.

Russia 
Russia re-elected Vladimir Putin as the president in 2012 Russian presidential election. The election was marred by claims of fraud, contributing to the 2011–2013 Russian protests. Under Putin, Russia engaged in a more aggressive foreign policy, with the 2014 Annexation of Crimea and intervention in Ukraine following the 2014 Ukrainian revolution, the 2015 intervention in the Syrian Civil War, and interference in the 2016 United States elections.

Spain 
Since the 2008–2014 Spanish financial crisis began, Spain had had one of the highest unemployment rates in Europe, reaching a eurozone record of 21.3%. The number of unemployed people in Spain stood at 4,910,200 at the end of March 2011, up about 214,000 from the previous quarter, while the youth unemployment rate stands at 43.5%, the highest in the European Union. In September 2010 the government approved a sweeping overhaul of the labour market designed to reduce unemployment and revive the economy. Large trade unions such as CCOO and Unión General de Trabajadores (UGT), among other minor ones, rejected the plan because it made it easier and cheaper for employers to hire and fire workers. Trade unions called for the first general strike in a decade, on 29 September 2010.

The anti-austerity movement in Spain, also referred to as the 15-M Movement and the Indignados Movement, was a series of protests, demonstrations, and occupations against austerity policies in Spain that began around the local and regional elections of 2011 and 2012. First starting on 15 May 2011, many of the subsequent demonstrations spread through various social networks such as Real Democracy NOW and Youth Without a Future. According to RTVE, the Spanish public broadcasting company, between 6.5 and 8 million Spaniards participated in these events.

Catalonia 
The 2009–2011 Catalan independence referendums, a series of non-binding and unofficial referendums, "popular votes" (consultes populars), took place in municipalities around Catalonia. In them voters indicated whether they supported Catalan independence from Spain. The first such referendum took place in Arenys de Munt on 13 September 2009: there followed votes in Sant Jaume de Frontanyà on 12 December and in 166 other municipalities on 13 December. Another vote ensued in April 2011 in Barcelona. Provisional figures for the 13 December vote suggest a turnout of around 200,000 (30% of those eligible to vote).

The 2012 Catalan independence demonstration was a protest march which occurred in central Barcelona in Catalonia, Spain, on 11 September 2012 during the National Day of Catalonia. Many newspapers and other news agencies described it as a "historic" demonstration and considered it to be the biggest protest march ever held in Catalonia since the restoration of democracy in Spain, surpassing other major demonstrations, including the 2010 Catalan autonomy protest.

A non-binding Catalan self-determination referendum was held on Sunday, 9 November 2014, to gauge support on the political future of Catalonia. While also referred to as "Catalan independence referendum", the vote was rebranded as a "participation process" by the Government of Catalonia, after a "non-referendum popular consultation" on the same topic and for the same date had been suspended by the Constitutional Court of Spain.

The 2017–2018 Spanish constitutional crisis started after the law intending to allow the 2017 Catalan independence referendum was denounced by the Spanish government under Prime Minister Mariano Rajoy and subsequently suspended by the Constitutional Court until it ruled on the issue. Some international media outlets have described the events as "one of the worst political crises in modern Spanish history".

The Catalan independence referendum of 2017 was held on 1 October 2017 in the Spanish autonomous community of Catalonia, passed by the Parliament of Catalonia as the Law on the Referendum on Self-determination of Catalonia and called by the Generalitat de Catalunya. It was declared unconstitutional on 7 September 2017 and suspended by the Constitutional Court of Spain after a request from the Spanish government, who declared it a breach of the Spanish Constitution. Additionally, in early September the High Court of Justice of Catalonia had issued orders to the police to try to prevent it, including the detention of various persons responsible for its preparation. Due to alleged irregularities during the voting process as well as to the use of force by the National Police Corps and Civil Guard, international observers invited by the Generalitat declared that the referendum failed to meet the minimum international standards for elections.

On 27 October, the Catalan parliament voted in a secret ballot to unilaterally declare independence from Spain, with most deputies of the opposition boycotting a vote considered illegal for violating the decisions of the Constitutional Court of Spain, as the lawyers of the Parliament of Catalonia warned. As a result, the government of Spain invoked the Constitution to remove the regional authorities and enforce direct rule the next day, with a regional election being subsequently called for 21 December 2017 to elect a new Parliament of Catalonia. Puigdemont and part of his cabinet fled to Belgium after being ousted, as the Spanish Attorney General pressed for charges of sedition, rebellion and misuse of public funds against them.

The trial of Catalonia independence leaders began on 12 February 2019 in the Supreme Court of Spain, in which 12 people were tried, including the previous vice president Oriol Junqueras of the regional government and most of the cabinet as well as political activists Jordi Sànchez and Jordi Cuixart and the former Speaker of the Parliament of Catalonia Carme Forcadell.  Nine of the 12 accused received prison sentences for the crimes of sedition; of them, four were also found guilty of misuse of public funds. Their sentences ranged from 9 to 13 years. The remaining three accused were found guilty of disobedience and were sentenced to pay a fine but received no prison term. The court dismissed the charges of rebellion. The verdict delivered by the Supreme Court sparked multiple protests across the region.

United Kingdom 

Following the 2010 general election, negotiations led to David Cameron becoming prime minister as the head of a coalition government with the Liberal Democrats – the youngest holder of the office since the 1810s and the first coalition government in the country's history since World War II. His premiership was marked by the ongoing effects of the late-2000s financial crisis; these involved a large deficit in government finances that his government sought to reduce through austerity measures. His administration passed the Health and Social Care Act and the Welfare Reform Act, which introduced large-scale changes to healthcare and welfare. He also enforced stricter immigration policies, introduced reforms to education and oversaw the 2012 London Olympics. The government privatised the Royal Mail and some other state assets, and legalised same-sex marriage in England and Wales. The Scottish National Party (SNP) became dominant in Scotland over the decade, with a referendum on Scottish independence held in 2014, returning a negative result.

When the Conservatives secured an unexpected majority in the 2015 general election, Cameron remained as prime minister, this time leading a Conservative-only government. Meanwhile, the Conservative's coalition partner, the Liberal Democrats, saw their worst result in the party's modern history. Also in 2015, the Labour Party elected Jeremy Corbyn as its leader, who was considered the most left-wing leader of the party since Michael Foot (1980–83). Cameron's second ministry was dominated by the 2016 referendum on the UK's continuing membership of the EU. Cameron introduced the referendum in order to fulfill a manifesto pledge, but campaigned on the side of the "remain" vote, along with most of the other major parties. Some members of the Conservatives, as well as the Democratic Unionist Party (DUP) and UK Independence Party (UKIP), campaigned to "leave." The "leave" vote unexpectedly won, and a few hours later Cameron announced he would resign. A leadership election was held and Cameron was succeeded by Theresa May. 

May became the UK's second female prime minister after Margaret Thatcher, as well as the first woman to hold two of the Great Offices of State. She began the process of withdrawing the UK from the European Union, triggering Article 50 in March 2017. The following month, she announced a snap general election, with the aims of strengthening her hand in Brexit negotiations and campaigning on "strong and stable" leadership. This election resulted in a hung parliament, in which the Conservatives actually losing seats, despite the party winning its highest vote share since 1983. The loss of an overall majority prompted her to enter a confidence and supply arrangement with the DUP of Northern Ireland to support a minority government. After versions of her draft withdrawal agreement were rejected by Parliament three times, she resigned in 2019 and was succeeded by Boris Johnson, her former Foreign Secretary. Following further defeats in Parliament, Johnson prorogued parliament, an act deemed illegal by the Supreme Court. Johnson then called a snap election in 2019, where he campaigned on a platform to "Get Brexit Done." The Conservatives won the largest majority in the House of Commons since the 1987 election, leading to the passing of a Brexit deal early in the next decade.

See also 

 2010s in political history
 2020s in political history

References

Bibliography

2010s in Europe
2010s in politics
2010s decade overviews